Christopher Kindred (born April 6, 1974) is an American professional wrestler who has appeared in numerous independent wrestling leagues, such as Xtreme Championship Wrestling, as well as the global phenomenon companies, World Wrestling Entertainment, Total Nonstop Action Wrestling and the International Wrestling Association, and is best known by his ring names Flash Flanagan and Slash Venom.

Professional wrestling career
Early in his career,  Kindred formed a team with Wolfie D, known as The Blacksheep. Flanagan also formed teams with Billy Travis, Nick Dinsmore, and Steven Dunn. Flanagan wrestled one match on WWF Monday Night Raw losing to Brian Christopher; he then wrestled 3 matches in 1999 on WWF Shotgun Saturday Night all in losing efforts.  From 1999 to 2002, he was signed to a developmental deal with the WWF/WWE. After being released from WWE, he worked in NWA:TNA as Kobain in The Disciples of the New Church with former partner Wolfie D (Slash). After TNA, he wrestled under the name Slash Venom in IWA Puerto Rico. In 2005, he briefly wrestled in Ring of Honor. He now wrestles on the southeast independent circuit, mainly in United States Wrestling Organization, Showtime All-Star Wrestling and New Era Pro Wrestling, as well as many promotions throughout Indiana. In November 2012, he returned to Ohio Valley Wrestling as a masked man attacking his old rival Trailer Park Trash. On December 5, he was unmasked, revealing that he was working for Josette Bynum to "take out the Trash from OVW".

On August 3, 2013, Flanagan won the OVW Television title and became a Triple Crown winner. However, he lost the title to Elijah Burke on September 11, 2013. In March 2015, during the main event at Hoosier Pro Wrestling, Scarecrow Eddie Felson and Wicked Clown jumped Flash. Then Flash demanded a title match against Double R Rob Ramer (the heavyweight champion), Scarecrow Eddie Felson and Wicked Clown (the HPW tag team champions) vs. him and The Van Zants for the April show.

Championships and accomplishments
 Hoosier Pro Wrestling
HPW Heavyweight Championship (3 times)
HPW Tri-State Championship (1 time)
Hall of Fame (Class of 2014)
IWA Puerto Rico
IWA World Heavyweight Championship (1 time)
IWA Intercontinental Championship (1 time) 
IWA World Tag Team Championship (4 times) – with Miguel Perez (1) and Chicano (3)
IWA Hardcore Championship (5 times)
Music City Wrestling
MCW North American Tag Team Championships (1 time) – with Wolfie D
National Wrestling Alliance
NWA North American Tag Team Championship (1 time) – with Wolfie D
New Era Wrestling
NEW Heavyweight Championship (1 time)
NWA Midwest
NWA Indiana Heritage Championship (1 time)
Ohio Valley Wrestling
OVW Heavyweight Championship (4 times)
OVW Hardcore Championship (1 time)
OVW Television Championship (1 time)
OVW Southern Tag Team Championship (5 times, inaugural) – with BJ Payne (1), Doug Basham (1), Nick Dinsmore (1, inaugural) and Trailer Park Trash (2)
Twelfth OVW Triple Crown Champion
Pennsylvania Championship Wrestling
PCW Americas Heavyweight Championship (1 time)
PCW Tag Team Championship (1 time) – with Glen Osbourne
Pro Wrestling Illustrated
PWI ranked him # 122 of the top 500 singles wrestlers in the PWI 500 in 1999
 Southern Illinois Championship Wrestling 
 SICW Classic Championship (4 times)
SICW Tag Team Championship (current) 
United States Wrestling Association
USWA World Tag Team Championship (6 times) – with Billy Travis (2), Steven Dunn (3), Doug Gilbert (1) and Nick Dinsmore (1)
XCW Midwest Championship Wrestling
XCW Midwest Heavyweight Championship (1 time)

References

External links 
 

1966 births
21st-century professional wrestlers
American male professional wrestlers
Living people
People from Indianapolis
Professional wrestlers from Indiana
USWA World Tag Team Champions
OVW Heavyweight Champions
20th-century professional wrestlers